Hastings, Nebraska, is a center of media in south-central Nebraska.  The following is a list of media outlets in the city.

Print

Newspapers
The Hastings Tribune is the city's newspaper, published six days a week.

Radio
In its Fall 2013 ranking of radio markets by population, Arbitron ranked the Grand Island-Kearney-Hastings market 251st in the United States. 

The following is a list of radio stations licensed to and/or broadcasting from Hastings:

AM

FM

Television
Hastings is a principal city of the Lincoln-Hastings-Kearney television market. The market includes the central portion of Nebraska as well as several counties in north-central Kansas.

The following is a list of television stations that broadcast from and/or are licensed to the city.

References

Mass media in Nebraska
Hastings, Nebraska